Hubac is a name of website brand, listed under Hubac Media.

Hubac Media is an internet marketing service provider. 

Website www.hubac.com